The Nikon D4 is a 16.2-megapixel professional-grade full frame (35mm) digital single-lens reflex camera (DSLR) announced by Nikon Corporation on 6 January 2012. It succeeds the Nikon D3S and introduces a number of improvements including a 16.2 megapixel sensor, improved auto-focus and metering sensors and the ability to shoot at an extended ISO speed of 204,800. The camera was released in February 2012 at a recommended retail price of $5999.95. It is the first camera to use the new XQD memory cards. It was replaced by the Nikon D4S as Nikon's flagship camera.

The Nikon D4 is aimed at sports and action photographers and photojournalists. With a continuous shooting rate of 10fps, a 20-second burst would yield 200 full-resolution images with full metering and autofocus for each frame. If exposure and focus are locked, the shooting rate can be increased to 11fps.

Features 
16.4 effective megapixel Full-Frame (36 mm × 24 mm) sensor with ISO 100–12800 (ISO 50–204800 Boost)
Nikon Expeed 3 image/video processor
91,000 pixel RGB metering sensor with Advanced Scene Recognition System
Advanced Multi-CAM3500FX auto-focus sensor (51-point, 15 cross-type)
0.12 s start up time and 0.042 s shutter release delay.
Image sensor cleaning
Ten frames per second in continuous FX mode (eleven frames per second with auto-exposure and auto-focus disabled)
Buffer for 100 RAW or 200 JPEG frames in one burst
Built-in HDR and time lapse modes
Built-in 10/100 base-T Ethernet port for data transfers and tethered shooting.
1080p Full HD movie mode at 24 fps worldwide and 25 or 30 depending on region, 720p at 25/50 or 30/60 fps, HDMI HD video out with support of uncompressed video output, stereo monitor headphone out, and stereo input (3.5-mm diameter) with manual sound level control.
Kevlar/carbon fibre composite shutter with a rating of 400,000 actuations 
Live View with either phase detect or improved contrast detect Auto Focus 
Virtual horizon indicates in Live View mode, also available during video capture
'Active D-Lighting' with 6 settings and bracketing (adjusts metering and D-Lighting curve)
Dual card slots, one CompactFlash UDMA and one XQD card slot (mirror, overflow, back-up, RAW on 1/JPEG on 2, Stills on 1/Movies on 2, copy) 
Fully weather sealed with O-rings
 GPS interface for direct geotagging supported by Nikon GP-1

Reception

The D4 achieved the fourth-best result in the DXOmark sensor rating, only beaten by two versions of the Nikon D800 and a medium format, 80-megapixel camera (Phase One IQ180).

References

External links 

 Nikon D4 Manual Nikon
 Nikon D4 Technical Guide Nikon
 Nikon D4 global product page at Nikon.com
 Nikon D4 USA specs, Nikon Inc.
 Nikon D4 overview at Digital Photography Review
 Nikon D4 news coverage at Estiasis.com

D4
D4
Live-preview digital cameras
Cameras introduced in 2012
Cameras made in Japan
Full-frame DSLR cameras